The Minister of Defence (Urdu: 'وزیرِ دفاع') heads the Ministry of Defence. The minister serves in the cabinet of the Prime Minister and is required to be a member of Parliament.

In the history of the country, the defence portfolio has usually been headed by the head of the government, be that the President or Prime Minister of the country. The first defence minister was Amir Azam Khan. He is the only person to hold maximum ministries in Pakistan. He was among the many people who drafted the constitution of Pakistan. Moreover, he also named the "Pakistan International Airways". He was also the founder of Al-Azam and the pioneer of low-cost housing schemes in Pakistan.

List of Defence Ministers

See also
Constitution of Pakistan
President of Pakistan
Prime Minister of Pakistan
Ministry of Defence Pakistan
Foreign Minister of Pakistan
Finance Minister of Pakistan
Interior Minister of Pakistan
Ministry of Defense Production

Notes

References

External links
 Ministry of Defence, Government of Pakistan
 Parliamentary Cabinet of Pakistan